Wayne Robert Anderson (born April 4, 1945) is an American former competition swimmer.

Anderson represented the United States as a 19-year-old at the 1964 Summer Olympics in Tokyo.  He competed in the men's 200-meter breaststroke, and finished seventh overall in the event final with a time of 2:35.0.

Anderson attended the University of Southern California (USC), where he swam for the USC Trojans swimming and diving team in National Collegiate Athletic Association (NCAA) competition from 1965 to 1967.  He was a six-time All-American as a college swimmer—three straight years in both the 100-yard and 200-yard breaststroke.

See also
 List of University of Southern California people

References

External links
  Wayne Anderson – Olympic athlete profile at Sports-Reference.com

1945 births
Living people
American male breaststroke swimmers
Olympic swimmers of the United States
Sportspeople from Nassau County, New York
Swimmers at the 1964 Summer Olympics
USC Trojans men's swimmers
Universiade medalists in swimming
People from Rockville Centre, New York
Universiade bronze medalists for the United States
Medalists at the 1965 Summer Universiade
20th-century American people